The 2011 Vancouver Stanley Cup riot was a public disturbance in the downtown core of Vancouver, British Columbia, Canada on the evening of June 15, 2011. The riot broke out almost immediately after the conclusion of the Boston Bruins' win over the Vancouver Canucks in game seven of the Stanley Cup Finals, which won the Stanley Cup for Boston. At least 140 people were injured during the incident, including 1 critically. At least 4 people were stabbed, 9 police officers were injured, and 101 people were arrested.

In 2015, four years after the riot, police finished their investigation and recommended the final charges against two suspects, bringing the total to 887 charges against 301 people.

Background 

City organizers had set up a two-block long fan zone on six-lane Georgia Street near the Rogers Arena. Two big screen TVs were set up for fans to watch the game. Temporary fences and gates were set up to provide checkpoints where police could control access to the area and check for alcohol (which police generally poured out when found). Following recommendations stemming from the 1994 riot, all liquor stores in the area were closed earlier in the day. Crowds had been generally well-behaved in the fan zone for the previous six games, with roughly 70,000 attending each event. Similar though smaller events had been very successful during the 2010 Winter Olympics. For the final game, an estimated 100,000 people crowded into the area, and people found ways to enter the zone without being checked for alcohol. Planned corridors to allow movement of emergency vehicles became impassable.

Violence occasionally occurs in the wake of sporting events in North America and Europe. The 2011 Vancouver riot is consistent with past Stanley Cup riots in Canada. Since the 1980s, Vancouver itself had riots following the Canucks' defeat in 1994, Edmonton Oilers fans set fires and looted in the Whyte Avenue ("Blue Mile") area of Edmonton when the team qualified for the 2006 finals, and Montreal was vandalized by Montreal Canadiens fans after both the 1986 and 1993 titles, and during the 2008 and 2010 playoffs.

Riot

On Wednesday, June 15, 2011, the riot began to take shape as the game came to a close at 7:45 p.m., with some spectators throwing bottles and other objects at the large screens in the viewing area. Boston Bruins flags and Canucks jerseys were set afire, and soon some rioters overturned a vehicle in front of the main post office. According to one eyewitness, a group who was heard chanting "Let's go riot, let's go riot" as early as the first period of the game were among those responsible for flipping the first car. Fist fights broke out when people standing on porta-potties fell when others tipped the porta-potties over. People began jumping on the car that had been first overturned; it was set afire at 7:46. With a crowd of onlookers chanting "burn the truck", a second vehicle in the same area was lit ablaze. Firemen were able to put it out,
but the truck was again set afire after it was overturned. In a nearby parking lot, two Vancouver Police squad cars were later also set on fire.
In total, 17 cars were burned, including police cars. Windows were smashed in a bank and various businesses along the West Georgia corridor, some of which were also looted. Riot police eventually managed to push the rioters away from Georgia, onto Granville Street and Robson Street, where the rioters then caused further substantial damage, breaking the windows of several shops and looting. Some of the stores affected were Future Shop, Sears and Chapters bookstore. One man was sent to hospital in critical condition after he attempted to jump from the Georgia Viaduct onto another platform and fell.

Several hundred theatregoers were attempting to leave after a showing of the Broadway musical Wicked but were trapped and remained inside the Queen Elizabeth Theatre, which was situated in the riot zone. Transit authorities diverted or halted bus routes normally running through the affected area, and police closed bridge lanes into the city so that people could leave the area but further arrivals were restricted. By midnight, the majority of the crowd had dispersed. The Vancouver Police Department made 101 arrests during the riot. 85 people were arrested for breach of peace, eight for public intoxication and eight for breaking and entering, assault or theft.

Aftermath

Response
In the immediate aftermath, Vancouver Mayor Gregor Robertson initially attributed the situation to "a small group of troublemakers". Vancouver Police Department Chief Jim Chu said that instigators appeared to be some of the same individuals involved in a protest on the opening day of the 2010 Winter Olympics, and that they came equipped with eye protection, gasoline and other tools. He called them "criminals and anarchists" who disguised themselves as fans. The idea that anarchists were involved in the violence was rejected by UBC political science professor Glen Coulthard, and others in a Vancouver Sun article on June 24. "That this gets tagged as anarchist activity is just more of an assumption or bias that has been around for a long time," said Coulthard. "[A]narchists are a convenient scapegoat for the police to deflect responsibility for what happened," said another commentator. One critic indicated that authorities had made several mistakes in the planning for the crowd—among them allowing parked cars near the screens and leaving newspaper boxes nearby which could be used as projectiles.

Cleanup
After the riot, thousands of volunteers organized via texting and social media sites such as Facebook and Twitter to clean up the damage. The estimated 15,000 volunteers, many taking a day off work, stated that they went downtown to clean up the damage to "... show that not all Canucks fans are like that". Streets were reportedly clean by 10 am, with volunteers having shown up with brooms and dustpans to clean the city. Boarded up windows were covered in apologies and defences of the city's reputation. In response, the Hudson's Bay Company, a major retailer in the area, hosted a free pancake breakfast in thanks.

Criminal prosecution
As many as 70 officers from eight different police agencies formed the Integrated Riot Investigation Team, tasked with sifting through hundreds of hours of video and other evidence to identify rioters. Several participants in the riots turned themselves in to police after their faces were broadcast on TV, including the person responsible for setting the first car on fire. More than 1,000,000 photos and 1,200 – 1,600 hours of video recorded by citizens were sent to the Vancouver Police Department as evidence. 

Insurance Corporation of British Columbia (ICBC) offered their facial-recognition software to the police in an attempt to aid in their criminal investigation of the riot. In 2012, the Information and Privacy Commissioner of British Columbia, Elizabeth Denham, ruled that police could not use the software without a warrant requesting the information.

By July 2013, police had recommended 1,204 criminal charges against 352 suspected rioters. In July 2015, over four years after the riots, the last two suspects were charged. By then, a total of 887 criminal charges had been laid against 301 suspects, 274 of whom pled guilty. However police said they would continue to act on any tips they are provided and future charges could be laid.

Social media
Following the riot, people were initially concerned about the role that social media may have played in fueling the riot. Christopher Schneider, a sociologist from the University of British Columbia says that there is not a lot of evidence to support that theory. Also important to note is that it can be difficult to discern sarcasm from honest, real intentions online. Social media did, however, play a large role during and after the riot.

Many participants in the riot stood and posed for photographs, with some even posting the photos on their own social media accounts. Photos and videos were also taken by onlookers intent on documenting the riot. In the aftermath, those photos and videos were used by many local people outraged by the riot, in an effort to tag and identify rioters and looters on Facebook, YouTube, and other social media sites, and to provide additional information to police for prosecution.
Community participation in assisting police to identify the rioters has been described as unprecedented,
and police admitted to being overwhelmed by the amount of evidence provided.
While riot instigators were described by police as a small group of anarchists, the collected photographs and videos revealed that many participants were not connected and had never been arrested before.
Online shaming campaigns resulted in some riot participants being fired from their jobs and removed from athletic teams. In some cases, violence was threatened against those identified as rioters, prompting one family to flee its home,
and others to express concern about the potential of mob mentality online.
The Vancouver Police Department appealed to citizens, online and otherwise, not to engage in acts of vigilante justice. A published study on social media vigilante justice, or "crowd-sourced policing", authored by sociologists Christopher Schneider and Daniel Trottier, concluded that online vigilantes can slow police investigations.

An issue related to social media and the riot police investigation was that a number of people involved in the rioting were under the age of 18. Names of minors are banned in the legal system. On social media, however, the sharing of images and videos alongside public shaming online can end up identifying the accused.

Financial losses
CBC News reported that the destruction caused by the rioters was worse than the riot that followed the Canucks loss in Game 7 of the 1994 Stanley Cup Finals, particularly the looting aspects. Early estimates suggested the losses due to vandalism, theft, and damage to property to be nearly $4.2 million. Several large-scale stores such as London Drugs, The Bay, Sears Canada and Future Shop were among many that were looted.

Investigation
A report released September 1, 2011 says that contributing factors to the riot were the number of people who attended the event and the level of alcohol consumption. With 155,000 people in an area meant to hold the expected 50,000, the situation deteriorated into a riot with hot spots spread over a large area, and the police's ability to control it was impeded by communication problems and location of equipment.

An independent review commissioned by the Province of British Columbia and the City of Vancouver released its 396-page report on August 31, 2011.

Media coverage 

The riots sparked intense media coverage and attention on the local, national, and international level. Local media coverage of the riots began almost immediately after the game ended, with the local CBC, CTV and Global BC stations all running news coverage of the riots, with CTV and CBC doing so from studios located in downtown Vancouver itself. CBC News Network started running live coverage in conjunction with its nationally broadcast evening news show The National, with one reporter calling in her reports from inside the riot.

Prominent publications such as The Atlantic, The Guardian, The New York Times and USA Today published editorials critical of the riots and its participants, as well as the city, noting the stark contrast between the Stanley Cup playoffs and the 2010 Winter Olympics. The Boston Herald provided coverage of the riots in addition to coverage of the Bruins' Stanley Cup celebrations, with other Boston media outlets providing their coverage of the riots.

A photograph depicting a young female lying on her back in a riot-torn street between lines of police, being consoled by a young male who holds her in an embrace in an apparent kiss, became an iconic image of the riots. Sports Illustrated called it "the most compelling sports image of the year". At first, many viewers suspected the scene had been staged. Evidence soon revealed that the Canadian woman, Alexandra Thomas of Coquitlam, British Columbia, had been knocked down by police; her Australian boyfriend, Scott Jones from Perth, Western Australia, was comforting her. In June 2016, it was reported that Thomas and Jones live in Perth, Australia, where they sleep under a poster copy of the photograph. The photograph is used as the album cover of A Place for Us to Dream, a compilation album by the English alternative rock band Placebo.

See also 
 1993 Montreal Stanley Cup riot
 Breach of the peace
 Collective effervescence
 Crowd psychology
 Disorderly conduct
 Hooliganism
 Public intoxication

References

External links 

Hockey Riot 2011 -  Vancouver Police Department
Vancouver Riots: New Life to Old Law

Vancouver Stanley Cup riot
riot
Vancouver Stanley Cup riot
Vancouver Stanley Cup riot
Riot 2011
History of the Boston Bruins
Riots and civil disorder in Canada
Sports riots
History of the Vancouver Canucks
Riot 2011
2010s in Vancouver
Vancouver
Hooliganism